Platinum Sterling is a registered trademark name of ABI Precious Metals, Inc. The trademark covers a range of alloys whose primary constituents are platinum and silver, primarily used in jewellery. The range of Platinum Sterling alloys was developed in 2003 by Marc Robinson, and its solder was created by Chuck Bennett.

Properties

The platinum is used to replace at least some of the copper present in a typical sterling silver alloy, which provides a greater light reflectivity (by refining the grain structure) and resistance to tarnish (thought to be caused by oxidation of copper) than standard sterling silver.

Platinum Sterling is a cheaper alternative to white gold. It is also allegedly hard wearing and very white and so does not require rhodium plating like white gold.

Composition
The composition of Platinum Sterling is published; three alloys are commercially available, all containing standard 92.5% sterling silver and 1%, 3.5% or 5% platinum. A small amount of gallium can also be added to the alloy to ease manufacturing. The patent application for Platinum Sterling claims:

The claim also states:

See also
 Platinaire
 List of alloys

References

Silver
Platinum
Precious metal alloys
Jewellery components